Compost (also titled Take Off Your Body)  is the eponymous debut album from Compost.  It features Jack DeJohnette, Bob Moses, Harold Vick, Jack Gregg and Jumma Santos. The album was recorded in 1971 and released on Columbia Records.

Track listing 
All compositions by Jack DeJohnette except as indicated
 "Take Off Your Body" (Bob Moses)
 "Thinkin'"
 "Bwaata" (Moses, DeJohnette)
 "Happy Peace"
 "Country Song" (Jack Gregg, DeJohnette)
 "Sweet Berry Wine" (DeJohnette, Moses, Harold Vick, Jumma Santos, Gregg)
 "Funky Feet" (DeJohnette, Moses, Vick, Santos, Gregg)
 "Inflation Blues"

Personnel 
 Jack DeJohnette – clavinet, organ, vibes, drums
 Bob Moses – drums, vocal
 Harold Vick – tenor saxophone, flute
 Jack Gregg – bass
 Jumma Santos – congas, percussion

References

External links 
 http://www.discogs.com/release/1277112

1972 debut albums
Columbia Records albums
CBS Records albums
Compost (band) albums